Tulsky (masculine), Tulskaya (feminine), or Tulskoye (neuter) is the name of several rural localities in Russia.

Modern localities
Tulsky, Republic of Adygea, a settlement in Maykopsky District of the Republic of Adygea
Tulsky, Saratov Oblast, a settlement in Samoylovsky District of Saratov Oblast
Tulskoye, Krasnoyarsk Krai, a village in Borodinsky Selsoviet of Rybinsky District of Krasnoyarsk Krai
Tulskoye, Lipetsk Oblast, a selo in Tulsky Selsoviet of Terbunsky District of Lipetsk Oblast

Historical names
Tulskaya, name of Tulsky, Republic of Adygea, until 1963